The Wright Stuff is a 1996 television documentary film about Orville and Wilbur Wright, the brothers who invented the first successful motor-powered airplane. Produced by PBS for The American Experience (now simply American Experience) documentary program, it recounts the lives of the Wright brothers from their early childhood in Ohio with dreams of flight to their subsequent fame after their successful 1908 demonstration in France. The film was written, produced, and directed by Nancy Porter, narrated by Garrison Keillor, and hosted by David McCullough, and was first aired on PBS in the United States on February 12, 1996.

McCullough himself would later become interested in the brothers' story, writing his own book about the Wright family in 2015.

Interviewees
Joseph Corn, historian
Tom Crouch, National Air and Space Museum
John Gillikin, national park service
Peter Jakab, National Air and Space Museum
Ivonette Wright-Miller, niece
Robert Wohl, historian
Wilkinson Wright, grand-nephew

Release
"The Wright Stuff" originally aired on PBS as part of The American Experience documentary program on February 12, 1996.

For home media, the film was first released on VHS in 1996. Later, it was released on DVD in North America on August 5, 2003.

References

External links
PBS official site

1996 television films
1996 documentary films
1996 films
American Experience
American documentary television films
Documentary films about aviation
1990s English-language films
Wright brothers